The Fellowship in Music, Australia (FMusA) is the highest qualification attainable by the Australian Music Examinations Board (AMEB). It is an examinable qualification, founded in 1992, although for the years 2018 and 2019 it was awarded only on an honorary basis.

The AMEB is a federated body which administers music examinations in Australia, and its Fellowship is considered a very prestigious award. To have presented for examination at this level, a candidate must have previously obtained the diploma of Licentiate in Music, Australia (LMusA) in the same subject.

Examinable qualification

Before 2017 
An FMusA practical examination took the form of a public recital, and was assessed by three examiners. Candidates had to present a repertoire that was 80 minutes in length, and presentation from memory was encouraged (and required for some subjects). An interval between pieces was allowed. Candidates received one of two grades at this level: "qualified" or "not qualified".

After 2017 
As of November 1, 2019, The AMEB has announced the return of the FMusA as an examinable qualification with a new syllabus.

References

 2012 Manual of Syllabuses. Australian Music Examinations Board. Victoria, 2011.

External links
 Australian Music Examinations Board

Academic degrees of Australia
Performing arts education in Australia